Philip Krämer (born 29 February 1992) is a German politician of Alliance 90/The Greens who has been serving as a member of the Bundestag since the 2021 German federal election.

Political career

Career in state politics
Krämer led the Green Youth in Hesse from 2017 to 2018. From 2019 to 2021, he served as co-chair of the Green Party in Hesse, alongside Sigrid Erfurth.

Member of the German Parliament, 2021–present
Krämer became a member of the Bundestag in 2021, representing the Odenwald district.In parliament, he has since been serving on the Defence Committee and the Sports Committee. He also joined a study commission set up to investigate the entire period of German involvement in Afghanistan from 2001 to 2021 and to draw lessons for  foreign and security policy in future.

Other activities
 German Poland Institute (DPI), Member of the Board of Trustees (since 2022)
 German Red Cross (DRK), Member
 SV Darmstadt 98, Member

References

External links 
 

Living people
1992 births
Politicians from Frankfurt
21st-century German politicians
Members of the Bundestag for Alliance 90/The Greens
Members of the Bundestag 2021–2025